Jacques Roux (21 August 1752 – 10 February 1794) was a radical Roman Catholic priest who took an active role in politics during the French Revolution. He skillfully expounded the ideals of popular democracy and classless society to crowds of Parisian sans-culottes, working class wage earners and shopkeepers, radicalizing them into a revolutionary force. He became a leader of a popular far-left.

Radical revolutionary 
In 1791 Roux was elected to the Paris Commune. When the French First Republic started in 1792, Roux became aligned with the political faction dubbed by their enemies as the Enragés (French for The Enraged Ones but also a "madman"). He was considered the most extreme spokesman on the left for the interests of the Parisian sans-culottes.

Roux consistently fought for an economically equal society, turning the crowds of sans-culottes against the bourgeois torpor of the Jacobins. He demanded that food be made available to every member of society, and called for the wealthy to be executed should they hoard it. Roux tirelessly voiced the demands of the poor Parisian population to confiscate aristocratic wealth and provide affordable bread.

He became popular enough that, as the split between the Girondins and the Montagnards grew wider, his voice helped remove the Girondins from the National Convention in 1793.

Manifesto of the Enragés 
In a controversial 1793 address to the National Convention that's been dubbed the Manifesto of the Enragés, Roux demanded the abolition of private property and class society in the name of the people he represented. In many ways Roux and the Enragés were prescient in anticipating many of the themes Karl Marx would develop in his analytical theory decades later.

Soon, Roux's incendiary rhetoric was igniting food riots and upsetting the balance of power within the Paris Commune. Maximilien Robespierre, fearing Roux threatened the dominance of the Jacobin government, presented accusations of him being a foreign spy intentionally trying to disrupt the revolutionary government and the Committee of Public Safety. During this time, Roux's former friend, Jean-Paul Marat, also turned against him, writing in his newspaper, L'Ami du peuple, that Roux was a false priest that was only interested in religion as long as it provided income. On 7 July 1793 Roux's enemies brought Elizabeth Marguerite Hébert in for questioning in an attempt to charge Roux with extortion and "misappropriation of charitable funds." Hébert was a recent widow with no means to support herself and, two years earlier, Roux had agreed to raise funds for her and her family. When asked if Roux had an ulterior motive, she replied that she did not believe he did. He wasn't arrested then, but in August 1793, Roux was arrested under the charges that he had withheld funds from both the widow Hébert and another widow, Mlle Beaurepaire. Roux assured the revolutionary committee of section Gravilliers that he did nothing of the sort and that his enemies were working against him. Roux was released into the custody of two of his friends, where he continued fighting for his ideals. On 5 September 1793 Roux was thrown into prison again.

Death 
On 14 January 1794 Roux was informed that his case was going to be tried by the Revolutionary Tribunal. Upon hearing this news, Roux pulled out a knife and stabbed himself several times, but failed to land a fatal blow. Less than a month later, on 10 February 1794, while recovering in prison, Roux stabbed himself again, this time succeeding in killing himself. He was 41.

As the Enragés movement began falling apart, Jacques Hébert's more moderate left-wing faction known as the Hébertists tried to win over his former supporters and continue where he had left off.

In popular culture 
Roux (played by Elias Toufexis) is featured in a mission in French Revolution-set Assassin's Creed Unity, in which the player is tasked with assassinating him. In Peter Weiss's Marat/Sade, Roux is portrayed by an asylum patient in the Marquis de Sade's dramatization of Jean-Paul Marat's assassination. The actor's lines come under fire by the asylum directors, who have cut his dialogue. In most productions, the actor portraying Roux is costumed in a straight jacket, which symbolizes the asylum's desire to restrain political radicals such as himself.

See also 
 Reign of Terror

References

External links 

 Jacques Roux Archive at Marxists Internet Archive

1752 births
1794 deaths
Christian radicals
Enragés
Far-left politicians in France
French radicals
Left-wing populism in France
People from Charente
People who committed suicide in prison custody
Suicides by sharp instrument in France
People who died in prison custody during the French Revolution
18th-century suicides